The Nutmeg's Curse: Parables for a Planet in Crisis is a 2021 non-fiction book by Amitav Ghosh. It discusses colonialism and environmental issues with particular focus on the Banda Islands. It is Ghosh's second non-fiction work to discuss climate change, after The Great Derangement: Climate Change and the Unthinkable (2016).

Background 

Ghosh had travelled to the Banda Islands in 2016. He returned to his notes from the trip and began writing The Nutmeg's Curse in March 2020. At the time, Ghosh was staying in his Brooklyn home during the outbreak of the COVID-19 pandemic in New York City. With the lockdown in place and Ghosh's wife Deborah Baker travelling to Virginia after the death of her mother, he was inspired to begin writing the book after finding an online PDF copy of an obscure book that recounted the massacre of the Bandanese. The text was entitled De Vestiging van het Nederlanshe Gezag over de Banda-Eilanden (1599-1621) (The Establishment of Dutch Rule Over the Band Islands), and its author was JA Van der Chijs. What particularly struck Ghosh was an aspect of the conquest of the Banda Islands, which had taken place in the village of Selamon on Banda Besar Island. On 21 April 1621, Maarten Sonck, a former tax official, was commissioned by the Dutch East India Company (VOC) to destroy the aforementioned village. When a lamp fell to the floor in the meeting room called "bale-bale", where the Dutch were staying, causing a fire, Sonck panicked, thinking that this was a signal of the local population's revolt against the colonisers. The reaction of the Dutch was terrible. They started shooting in the dark, massacring, dismembering and torturing the natives.

Synopsis 
In The Nutmeg's Curse, Ghosh recounts the conquest of the Banda Islands by the Dutch East India Company for nutmeg. This includes the massacre of the Bandanese people in 1621. He uses this as a analogy to discuss climate change and contemporary environmental issues.

Reception 
According to review aggregator Book Marks, the book received "rave" reviews, based on 6 reviews. Andrea Wulf described it as a "strange book, but not in a bad way" in a review for the Financial Times, saying it is "meandering and looping". Although Wulf said Ghosh's ideas were not new, she praised it, saying "the simplicity of his main argument and the power of his storytelling that makes the book work."

References

External links 
 Excerpt in Hindustan Times
 Interview with Ghosh at New Statesman

2021 non-fiction books
Environmental non-fiction books
Climate change books
History books about the Dutch Empire
Works about the Dutch East India Company
Works about colonialism
Books by Amitav Ghosh
Parables

Banda Islands
History books about Indonesia
University of Chicago Press books
John Murray (publishing house) books